The name Amarpal Singh may refer to 
 Amarpal Singh Aam Aadmi Party Punjab politician
 Amarpal Singh Ajnala  Shiromani Akali Dal Punjab politician
 Amar Pal Singh BJP UP politician

See also
 Amar Singh (disambiguation)